Ann Catrin Apstein-Müller (also Ann Catrin Bolton) was born on 13 April 1973 in Gräfelfing, near Munich, Bavaria, and is a German poet and translator. She lives and works in Augsburg.

Life and work 
Ann grew up in a Munich suburb, where she finished school with the Abitur in 1992. After that she studied German literature and American literature and Media law at Ludwig Maximilian University of Munich and trained as a Bookseller. After ten years of part-time work in a bookshop, which she used to build up her freelance business, she now works as a freelance translator and editor for literary and specialized texts. She started writing poems when she was still at elementary school; in her most intensive poetic period between 2000 and 2013 her poems were mainly based on her own life and observations combined with influences from music, film and literature.

Since 2005, she has worked mainly as a translator from Slovenian and English. She translated numerous works and plays by Slovenian authors into German.
In November 2015 she published her first own poetry book titled Sonnenhonig (Sun honey) in the series 100 Gedichte (100 poems) of the publisher Martin Werhand Verlag. Her second poetry book, titled Degravitation, was published one year later by the same publisher. Apart from poems – the first were published in 2002 in the anthology series Junge Lyrik (Young Poetry) by Martin Werhand Verlag – she also published short prose, for example in the German literary magazine Dichtungsring.

Published translations

Books 
 Aleš Šteger, Preußenpark: Berliner Skizzen, Suhrkamp Verlag, Frankfurt a. M. 2009,  (Orig.: Berlin, Beletrina 2007)
 Pero Simić, Tito – Geheimnis des Jahrhunderts, Orbis 2012,  (Orig.: Tito – skrivnost stoletja, Orbis 2010)
 Tadej Golob, Der Goldene Zahn, Schruf&Stipetic, Berlin 2015,  (Orig.: Zlati zob, Mladinska knjiga 2011)
 Evald Flisar, Der Zauberlehrling, Hermagoras, Klagenfurt 2015,  (Orig.: Čarovnikov vajenec, 9. izd., KUD Sodobnost International, 2013)
 Davorin Lenko, Körper im Dunkeln, DSP/Litterae Slovenicae; Ljubljana 2016,  (Orig.: Telesa v temi, Center za slovensko književnost 2013) 
 Miha Mazzini, Deutsche Lotterie, Transit Buchverlag 2016,  (Orig.: Nemška loterija, Beletrina 2010)
 Marko Sosič, Tito, amor mijo, Drava, Klagenfurt 2016,  (i.V. Orig.: Tito, amor mijo, Litera 2005)
 Evald Flisar, Über den Wolken, Klagenfurt 2017,  (i. V. Orig.: Besede nad oblaki)
 Anita Šumer, Verrückt nach Sauerteig, Unimedica, Kandern, 2019  (i. V. Orig.: Drožomanija)
 Jana Bauer, Die kleine Gruselfee, Frankfurt am Main 2019,  (i. V. Orig.: Groznovilca v Hudi hosti)
 Maja Gal Štromar, Denk an mich, auch in guten Zeiten, Bad Herrenalb, 2020,  (i. V. Orig.: Misli name, ko ti je lepo)
 Veronika Dintinjana, Gelb brennt der Forsythienstrauch, Ljubljana, 2020,  (i. V. Orig.: Rumeno gori grm forzici)

Plays 
 Simona Semenič, 5jungs.net, Kaiserverlag, Wien 2009
 Simona Semenič, Sie da, sehen Sie uns (denn) wirklich nie oder (tun Sie s) etwa doch?, Volkstheater Wien 2010
 Evald Flisar, Und Leonardo?, Theater im Keller, Graz, DEA Oktober 2012

Articles in books and magazines 
 Aleš Šteger, Tacitus in der U-Bahn-Station, in: Sprache im technischen Zeitalter 183, Köln 2007
 Aleš Šteger, Erbarmen! Erbarmen! Herr Professor, verstehen Sie das Leben?, in: Osteuropa 2-3/2009, Berlin 2009 
 Aleš Šteger, Die Erschaffung der verlorenen Zeit, in: Branko Lenart, Styrians, Kultur in Leibnitz, Leibnitz 2009
 Aleš Šteger, Wozu?, in: Josef Trattner, Sofa, Schlebrügge.Editor, Wien 2010
 Milan Kleč, Schieler, in: Ostragehege 59, Dresden 2010 
 Stanka Hrastelj, 9 Gedichte für das Projekt European Borderlands des LCB, 2010 
 Aleš Šteger, Gegen die Phantome, Vortrag Europäische Literaturtage 2010, Wachau, Österreich
 Ana Pepelnik, 11 Gedichte für lyrikline.org 
 Tadej Golob, Schweinsfüße (Auszug), Slovene Studies 34/1-2, Bowling Green 2012

Own works

Books 
 2015: Sonnenhonig: 100 Gedichte, Martin Werhand Verlag, Melsbach, 
 2016: Degravitation: 50 Gedichte in Deutsch - 50 Poems in English, Martin Werhand Verlag, Melsbach,  (Also second, revised edition)

Own articles in literature and professional magazines 
 2002: Gedichte in: Junge Lyrik III, Martin Werhand Verlag, 
 2003: Notamerica (Kurzprosa) in: Torso 12, Berlin/München
 2008: e = mc² (Kurzprosa) in: Dichtungsring, Nr. 36, Bonn 
 2009: "Wieder vereint/Reunited" (Kurzprosa) in: The Vanderbilt Berlin Wall Project, ed. Beatrix Brockman, Nashville /Tennessee,  
 2009: Gedichte in: anthologie blauer salon – eins, glauche-löwe-milserliteraturprojekte gbr, Duisburg,

Literature 
 Ann Catrin Apstein-Müller In: Deutsches Literatur-Lexikon. Das 20. Jahrhundert - Nachtragsband: A - E Volume 1, Verlag Walter de Gruyter, 2020, 
 Ann Catrin Apstein-Müller In: Nicolai Riedel Bibliographisches Handbuch der deutschsprachigen Lyrik 1945–2020, Metzler, Heidelberg, 2023, S. 514,

See also

External links 
 
 Wortstromer Übersetzung & Lektorat, Ann Catrin Bolton & Piers Bolton Official Website

References 

1973 births
Living people
Writers from Augsburg
People from Munich (district)
21st-century German women writers
21st-century German poets
German women poets
German-language poets
Modernist poets
Modernist women writers
German translators
Academic staff of the Ludwig Maximilian University of Munich
21st-century translators